Claudia Belk (born Claudia Erwin Watkins; July 10, 1937 – February 8, 2017) was an American judge, lawyer and philanthropist. She was a prominent woman in North Carolina law, and the wife of John M. Belk, a four-term mayor of Charlotte.

Early life 
Claudia Erwin Watkins was born in Durham, North Carolina, on July 10, 1937, the daughter of a tobacco wholesaler named Warren Byers Watkins. She went to Hollins University, which was at the time known as Hollins College, studying in Paris. She was one of only two women to graduate from the University of North Carolina School of Law in 1963.

Career 
After graduating law school, Belk opened her own law practice. In 1968, she served as the assistant clerk for the Superior Court of Mecklenburg County. Belk was recognized in retrospect for the rarity of women practicing law at that time. She also became one of the first women elected to public office in the county when she won a race for district judge in 1968. Belk told an interviewer that she had some difficulties as "Mecklenburg's only lady judge", such as being called "Miss Judge", "Honey", or "Sir", as well as having to "shorten and 'slim down her robe. Belk also pushed back on the idea that as a woman, she would be too emotional to make decisions in her domestic and juvenile court, remarking that she was educated for the job. Belk commented that it was "no big deal", and that she did not want to compromise her femininity for the job.

In 2000, it was announced that the public safety building at Central Piedmont Community College would be renamed the "Claudia Watkins Belk Center for Justice". Belk sat on the college's board, and the Belk Foundation had given $500,000 to the college. Classes in the building train students to become firefighters and police officers, among other professions.

In 2014, the Belk family donated to the Novant Health hospital, supporting the construction of the "John M. and Claudia W. Belk Heart and Vascular Institute".

Personal life 
In 1968, Watkins met John M. Belk, known as "Charlotte's most eligible bachelor", at a reception for the Democratic Women's Club. John was CEO of the Belk department store chain at the time. He was elected as the mayor of that city the following year. The couple attracted some media attention when they were married in 1971, with the wedding being reported as "the talk of the town". John's niece commented that "It was kind of like a made-for-TV match: Beautiful district court judge marries city mayor". The couple had one child, named Mary Claudia, who sold 693 boxes of Girl Scout Cookies when Claudia brought her to a Democratic Women's Club party.

Claudia Belk died on February 8, 2017.

References 

1937 births
2017 deaths
People from Durham, North Carolina
Hollins University alumni
University of North Carolina School of Law alumni
20th-century American judges
North Carolina Democrats
North Carolina state court judges
North Carolina lawyers
20th-century American women judges